Women Organized to Resist and Defend (WORD or W.O.R.D.) is a feminist organization that was founded in 2012, and a subsidiary of the Party for Socialism and Liberation.

Founding
The foundation for all future activism by WORD is based on the four main demands they established in their inception: Full reproductive rights, defending women in the workplace, stopping the budget cuts, and full respect and equality now (an end to anti-LGBT bigotry).

Mission
WORD strives to rebuild an in the streets grassroots movement mirroring that of the 1960s civil rights and women's rights movements. WORD attempts to bring women, men, and non-binary people together as a community to fight for its four demands via direct action.

Education and Advocacy
WORD has seven chapters, including in the states of California, New York, and Illinois. It has aligned itself with the trade union UNITE HERE and older political organizations geared strictly towards women's liberation such as New York Women's Liberation.

WORD's activism includes national campaigns on legislation may affect women's reproductive rights, social welfare and education and general civil rights. WORD also relies heavily on direct action to bring attention the issues it rallies behind and uses guerrilla tactics like banner dropping to spread information. As a subsidiary of PSL it shares resources, tactics, and membership with the party as well as its subsidiary the A.N.S.W.E.R. Coalition.

National campaigns on key health issues like access to contraceptives and abortion support WORD's four demands. WORD as an organization demands full reproductive rights, an end to sex based discrimination in the workplace (i.e. equal pay, an end to sexual harassment, maternity leave), an end to social welfare cuts, and full respect and equality.

WORD's advocacy work through direct actions like flash mobs, forums, conferences, social media websites such as Facebook and Tumblr, and community outreach.

Funding
Membership contributions (financial and physical) and donations are WORD's primary source of funding. It does not disclose funding reports.

Notable protests
The group protested against the Zimmerman verdict, and showed support to free Chelsea Manning.

References

External links
http://www.defendwomensrights.org/
http://answercoalition.org

Feminist organizations in the United States
Organizations established in 2012
Women's organizations based in the United States
2012 establishments in California